Still Dreaming (stylized in all caps) is the first Japanese-language studio album by South Korean boy band Tomorrow X Together. The album was released by Big Hit Entertainment, Universal Music Japan, and Republic Records  on January 20, 2021, three months after their third extended play Minisode1: Blue Hour (2020). The ten tracks are Japanese versions of six of the group's Korean hits, plus two new instrumental tracks, a brand new Japanese original song, “Force”, and the band's previous Japanese hit “Everlasting Shine”. Recorded in Japanese and English language, Still Dreaming is a J-pop album that borrows numerous musical elements including disco, pop rock, and synth-pop.

The album became the group's third consecutive number one on the Oricon Albums Chart—after The Dream Chapter: Eternity and Minisode1: Blue Hour—with first week sales of over 87,000 copies. It was the group's first album to cross 100,000 copies in Japan and its third release to be certified by the Recording Industry Association of Japan (RIAJ), achieving gold status that same month.

Background
In March 2019 South Korean boy band Tomorrow X Together debuted with extended play “The Dream Chapter: Star” that portrayed the experiences that boys encounter in the process of growing up. The following releases, “The Dream Chapter: Magic” continued their story of growing from adolescent. In January 2020 TXT debuted in Japan with the single “Magic Hour” which contains the Japanese version of previously released songs. Subsequently, they released their second Japanese single “Drama” in August leading up to the release of their Japanese studio album announced on November 23, 2020, with the release date of January 20, 2021. The album contains songs from all their previous releases.

In November 2020 it was revealed that the single “Force” would be written by Motoki Omori from Mrs. Green Apple, a five-member Japanese rock band from Tokyo. The single was featured as the theme song for the second season of TV Asahi animation series “World Trigger”.

Release and promotion

Distribution
The album was pre-released digitally on January 19, followed by physical release a day later. Limited territories outside of Japan received the physical editions. Physical pre-orders for the album began on November 23, after the different Limited and Regular versions of the album were announced. Six versions of the album were made available: two Limited Editions A and B, a CD only Regular Edition, and three limited editions of the regular edition. Limited Editions A includes the CD and lyrics paper in a Keep case which is encased in a limited-edition deluxe slip case with two 24-page booklet filled with daytime photos and sunset-time photos respectively. Limited Editions B includes a Jewel case containing a CD and a DVD featuring the music video for "Blue Hour (Japanese Ver.)," a making-of video and footage from cover photoshoot, a lyric booklet as well as a 12-page booklet filled with daytime and sunset-time photos encased in a limited-edition slip case. Contrarily, the CD-only Regular Edition comes with a lyric booklet instead and one of five random "Standard ver." photocards included as a first-press only bonus. The Weverse Shop Japan, The Universal Music Store and Loppi•HMV Limited Editions of this version also include a lyric booklet with the former two having B3 size poster and later having a post card as their respective bonuses. All albums share the same track listing. Following commercial success in Japan, the album was later release in United States on February 12, 2021, through Universal Music Enterprises (UME), a catalog division of Universal Music Group.

Marketing
Yunika Vision ran a half-hour long special feature of six full-length uncut version of TXT music videos including "Blue Hour [Japanese Ver.]" on its screens in front of Seibu-Shinjuku Station from January 21 to January 27; the feature was also accessible for mobile viewing with high-quality sound via the "VISION α" app.

Live performances
TXT held the premiere performance of Japanese version of "Blue Hour" on TBS Japan's CDTV Live! Live! Christmas 4-hour special on December 21 via pre-recorded video. They guested on Nippon TV's Buzz Rhythm 02 on January 22 for their second performance of Japanese version of "Blue Hour". The band presented the song again next week on the January 26 broadcast of Nippon TV's Sukkiri.

The band performed "Force" for the first time on TV Asahi's Music Station on January 29. They performed the song again on TV Asahi's Break Out on February 3. They performed the song "Force" in a Single-Take for The First Take which premiered on YouTube channel on February 10. The band continued promoting the album at the TBS Japan's Music Day by performing "Force" on July 17, 2021.

Commercial performance
The album debuted atop the Oricon Weekly Album Chart on chart issue dated February 1, 2021, making it the third consecutive album in Japan to reach  number one on Oricon's weekly chart. Still Dreaming also continued in first place on Oricon's daily album chart for six consecutive days after its release, marking first place six times in total during the first week. According to Oricon, TXT's album recorded an estimated 87,000 units in sales within the first week of release. On Billboard Japans Hot Albums chart, Still Dreaming entered atop, selling an estimated 100,000 units.

On February 12, the Recording Industry Association of Japan (RIAJ) announced that Still Dreaming had sold over 100,000 copies and eventually received a gold certification. The album reached the benchmark within a month of its release on January 20, 2021.

In United States, TXT marked their 3rd entry on the Billboard 200 when Still Dreaming debuted at 173, making them the first artist since BTS to chart on Billboard 200 with a Japanese-language album."TXT Becomes Second Korean Artist Ever To Have A Japanese Album On The Billboard 200 Chart". Koreaboo. Retrieved November 7, 2021.

Track listingNotes'''
  signifies a co-producer
 "Dreaming" in "Intro: Dreaming", "Crown", and "Still" in "Outro: Still" are all stylized in all caps

Personnel
Credits adapted from Tidal and the liner notes of Still Dreaming''.

Musicians

 Tomorrow X Together – primary artist 
 Soobin – gang vocals , backing vocals 
 Yeonjun – narration , backing vocals , gang vocals 
 Beomgyu – gang vocals 
 Taehyun – backing vocals , gang vocals 
 Hueningkai – backing vocals , gang vocals 
 Revin – songwriting , gang vocals 
 Slow Rabbit – songwriting 
 Motoki Ohmori – songwriting, backing vocals 
 Kyler Niko – songwriting, backing vocals 
 Lil 27 Club – songwriting 
 "Hitman" Bang – songwriting 
 Masaya Sakudo – Japanese lyrics 
 Adora – gang vocals 
 Kim Boram – gang vocals 
 Kim Chorong – gang vocals 
 Yoo Hankyul – gang vocals 
 Jeong Woo Yeong – gang vocals 
 Hiju Yang – gang vocals 
 Kim Jeeyeon – gang vocals 
 Hyun Ju Lim – gang vocals 
 Ko Ryongwoo – gang vocals 

 Supreme Boi – songwriting 
 Melanie Joy Fontana – songwriting, backing vocals 
 Michel "Lindgren" Schulz – songwriting 
 Andreas Carlsson – songwriting 
 Pauline Skótt – songwriting 
 Peter St. James – songwriting 
 Zopp – Japanese lyrics 
 Mayu Wakisaka – songwriting 
 Shoko Fujibayashi – Japanese lyrics 
 Pdogg – songwriting 
 Peter Ibsen – songwriting 
 Naitumela Masuki – songwriting 
 Jake Torrey – songwriting, backing vocals 
 Noah Conrad – songwriting 
 Roland "Rollo" Spreckley – songwriting 
 El Capitxn – songwriting 
 Yohei – lyrics, backing vocals 
 Uta – composition 
 Eric Zayne – songwriting 
 Naz Tokio – songwriting 
 Summergal – songwriting

Instrumentation

 Revin – keyboard, synthesizer 
 Slow Rabbit – synthesizer, keyboard 
 Young – guitar  
 Motoki Ohmori – guitar 
 Del Atkins – bass 
 Serg Dimitrijevic – guitar 
 Lee Taewook – guitar 

 Pdogg – keyboard, synthesizer 
 Noah Conrad – keyboard, synthesizer 
 El Capitxn – keyboard, synthesizer 
 Choi Hyung Jong – guitar 
 Uta – keyboard, synthesizer, guitar 
 Summergal – keyboard

Production

 "Hitman" Bang – production , executive production 
 Kazuhiro Imanari – executive production 
 Revin – production 
 Motoki Ohmori – production, musical arrangement 
 Uta – musical arrangement 
 Slow Rabbit – production , vocal arrangement 
 Adora – vocal arrangement 

 Supreme Boi – vocal arrangement 
 Pdogg – production ,vocal arrangement 
 Noah Conrad – production 
 El Capitxn – vocal arrangement , production 
 Hiss Noise – vocal arrangement 
 Uta – production

Technical

 Kim Jeeyeon – engineering 
 Slow Rabbit – engineering , digital editing 
 Jeong Woo Yeong – mixing , engineering 
 Chris Gehringer – mastering 
 Motoki Ohmori – programming, engineering 
 Kim Chorong – engineering , digital editing 
 D.O.I – mixing 
 Revin – digital editing 
 Erik Reichers – engineering 
 Kyler Niko – engineering 
 Josh Gudwin – mixing 
 Elijah Merrit-Hitch – mixing assistance 
 Heidi Wang – mixing assistance 
 Michel “Lindgren” Schulz – engineering 
 John Hanes – mixing 

 Hiroshi Hayashi – digital editing 
 Phil Tan – mixing 
 Supreme Boi – digital editing 
 El Capitxn – digital editing 
 Park Eunjeong – engineering 
 Jaycen Joshua – mixing 
 Jacob Richards – mixing assistance 
 Mike Seaberg – mixing assistance 
 DJ Riggins – mixing assistance 
 Pdogg – engineering 
 Noah Conrad – engineering 
 Yang Ga – mixing 
 Uta – engineering 
 Park Jinse – mixing

Artwork

 Yumiko Kobayashi – visual creator
 Nu Kim – visual creator
 Lee Hyun-ju – visual creator
 Jung Su – visual creator
 Jung Rakta – visual creator

 Kim Seung-won – hair
 Han Ah-reum – make up
 Kim Kyu-nam – stylist
 Michiyo Goda – photography

Charts

Weekly charts

Monthly charts

Year-end charts

Certifications and sales figures

Release history

See also
Album era
List of Oricon number-one albums of 2021
List of Billboard Japan Hot Albums number ones of 2021
List of K-pop albums on the Billboard charts

Footnotes

References

External links
 
 Oricon album profile (in Japanese)
 

2021 albums
Japanese-language albums
Tomorrow X Together albums
Republic Records albums
Universal Music Japan albums
Universal Music Group albums